Louise Seguin was the first European woman to travel to the Antarctic region, disguised as a boy or a courtesan on the 1772–1773 voyage of Yves-Joseph de Kerguelen. She explored the Kerguelen Islands with the crew of the Roland, and her presence was used to discredit Kerguelen.

References 

French explorers
18th-century French people
Female-to-male cross-dressers